St Chamond may refer to:

 Saint Chamond otherwise Annemund, bishop of Lyon
 Saint-Chamond, Loire, a French town named after him
 Saint-Chamond (manufacturer), informal name for the Compagnie des forges et aciéries de la marine et d'Homécourt, a French manufacturer based in the town of Saint-Chamond
 Saint-Chamond (tank)
 Saint-Chamond 75 mm gun